Aggey may refer to:

 John Kwao Amuzu Aggey, Archbishop of the Roman Catholic Archdiocese of Lagos, Nigeria
 The Aggey, informal name for Moss Valley, Wrexham, Wales

See also

 Agaie, a town and local government area in Nigeria
 Agaie Emirate, a historical state in present-day Nigeria 
 Agey, a commune in Côte-d'Or, Bourgogne, France
 Aggai (disambiguation)
 Aggay, a barangay (district) of Bantay, Ilocos Sur, Philippines 
 Agge (disambiguation)
 Aggi (disambiguation)
 Aggie (disambiguation)
 Aggy (disambiguation)
 Aghai, an Irish pentagraph
 Agi (disambiguation)
 Agii (disambiguation)
 Haggai, a saint and minor prophet